Ahmed Al Ganehi (Arabic:أحمد الجانحي) (born 22 September 2000) is a Qatari footballer. He currently plays as a winger for Al-Gharafa .

Career
Al Ganehi started his career at Al-Gharafa and is a product of the Aspire Academy's youth system. On 23 February 2019, Al Ganehi made his professional debut for Al-Gharafa against Al-Duhail in the Pro League, replacing Ahmed Alaaeldin .

International goals

Qatar U23

External links

References

Living people
2000 births
Qatari footballers
Qatar youth international footballers
Aspire Academy (Qatar) players
Al-Gharafa SC players
Qatar Stars League players
Association football wingers
Place of birth missing (living people)
Qatar under-20 international footballers